Lakeland station is a train station in Lakeland, Florida, that is served by Amtrak, the national passenger rail system of the United States. It is served by the Silver Star train, which runs daily between New York City and Miami. The station is located on the northern shore of Lake Mirror.

Lakeland is unique among all Amtrak stations in that it has two separate Amtrak station codes; one for passengers traveling to and from points north and the other for passengers traveling to and from points south. Since 2004, when the Silver Star initially arrives in Lakeland from either New York or Miami, it heads west to Tampa, then returns to Lakeland over the same route. After its second stop in Lakeland, the train continues on a bit further east along its previous route and then finally turns north toward New York or south toward Miami. Passengers disembarking at Lakeland station do so before the train heads to Tampa and passengers boarding at Lakeland only do so after the train returns from Tampa. This logical arrangement allows passengers boarding or debarking at the Lakeland station to avoid having to make an unnecessary trip to Tampa before continuing on their way. (Excluding Tampa, the next southbound stop on the Silver Star is in Winter Haven and the next northbound station is in Kissimmee.)

History

The original Lakeland station's structure was opened by the South Florida Railroad in 1886 as a two-story wooden edifice that burned down in 1901. The replacement proved to be inadequate for contemporary railroad needs and was replaced in 1910 by the South Florida Railroad's successor, Atlantic Coast Line Railroad (ACL), with a one-story brick building. This too would be hit by a fire on January 1, 1918 that caused $25,000 worth of damage. The building was given a second story and reopened on January 31, 1919.

This station was larger than the current one, boasting three platforms and three tracks. When the ACL merged with the Seaboard Air Line Railroad (SAL) on July 1, 1967, the station became the property of the Seaboard Coast Line Railroad (SCL), and later CSX Transportation, the successor to SCL. When Amtrak moved to the current station, this station was abandoned. The former station building was demolished in 2008, but the passenger platforms and canopies were initially left in place. However, in January of 2021, the canopies would also be demolished with the rubble being used to fill in the abandoned center station track between the platforms. The platforms are the only remaining remnants of the station, alongside the parking lot and the inner station track, which is used by CSX for occasional storage of railcars. In addition to the Silver Star the previous station was also served by the Champion until 1979, the Silver Palm from 1982 to 1985, and the Palmetto from 1996 until it was closed.

On April 15, 2009, the Lakeland station made news headlines when a decomposed female body was discovered by a passenger waiting for a late-running train. The body was identified as 34-year-old Shawn Hazel Turk and in August 2011 Reginald Riggins was arrested in connection with her death. It is believed that Mr. Riggins had never met the victim prior to April 9, 2009 (the night of her death). Riggins was later convicted of murdering of Turk and was sentenced to 25 years in prison.

Former service
Historically, Lakeland was a junction for Atlantic Coast Line, for a north-south line, and for an east-west line. North, trains went to Chicago and New York City. South, trains went to Naples. West, trains went to Tampa and Venice; east, trains went to Orlando, en route to New York City.

Named trains making stops in Lakeland included: City of Miami, Dixie Flyer, Flamingo, Floridian, Havana Special, Palmetto, Seminole, South Wind and West Coast Champion.

Services
Besides the Silver Star, Amtrak Thruway Motorcoach (with connection service by Martz First Class) is provided to the following: Orlando (train station), Tampa (train station), Pinellas Park (Clearwater and St. Petersburg), Bradenton, Sarasota, Port Charlotte, and Fort Myers.  Thruway Motorcoach service is also provided (with connection service by Amtrak) to Dade City (train station), Wildwood (train station), The Villages (Spanish Springs Shuttle Station), Ocala (train station), Gainesville (Rosa Parks Region Transportation System Downtown Station), Waldo (train station), and Jacksonville (train station) since train service by the Palmetto was discontinued south of Savannah, Georgia in 2004.

Connections
Amtrak Thruway Motorcoach
Citrus Connection; #11, #12 and #21 and soon a #100 bus

Notes

References

External links

Lakeland Amtrak Station, and former Seaboard Air Line Station (USA Rail Guide – TrainWeb)
March 2004 Photographs (Unofficial Amtrak Photo Gallery)
View of Station
View of Tracks & Platform

Amtrak stations in Florida
Buildings and structures in Lakeland, Florida
Transportation buildings and structures in Polk County, Florida
Amtrak Thruway Motorcoach stations in Florida
Atlantic Coast Line Railroad stations
1998 establishments in Florida
Railway stations in the United States opened in 1998